Carl Sofus Lumholtz (23 April 1851 – 5 May 1922) was a Norwegian explorer and ethnographer, best known for his meticulous field research and ethnographic publications on indigenous cultures of Australia and Mexico.

Biography

Born in Fåberg, Norway, Lumholtz graduated in theology in 1876 from the Royal Frederick University, now the University of Oslo.

Australia 

Lumholtz travelled to Australia in 1880, where he spent ten months from 1882-1883 among the indigenous inhabitants of the Herbert-Burdekin region in North Queensland. He wrote a book about his experience, Among Cannibals: An Account of Four Years' Travels in Australia and of Camp Life with the Aborigines of Queensland, first published in 1889, which is regarded as the finest ethnographic research of the period for the northern Queensland Aborigines.

Whereas previous authors had commented only upon the aesthetic physical appearances and material culture of the region's indigenous people, Lumholtz added a level of academic research that was unique for the period.  His work recorded for the first time the social relationships, attitudes and the role of women in the society. He also gave a series of two lectures on Among Australian Natives for the Lowell Institute for their 1889–90 season.

He spent four years in Queensland; his expeditions included visits to the Valley of Lagoons and the Herbert River area. He made collections of mammals while living with the local peoples, these specimens were used for the descriptions of four new species. One of these was named for the type locality, Pseudochirulus herbertensis (Herbert River Ringtail Possum), and another commemorates his name, Dendrolagus lumholtzii (Lumholtz's Tree Kangaroo).

Mexico 

Lumholtz later travelled to Mexico with the Swedish botanist C. V. Hartman  He stayed for many years, conducting several expeditions from 1890 through to 1910 which were paid for by the American Museum of Natural History.  His work, Unknown Mexico, was a 1902 two-volume set describing many of the indigenous peoples of northwestern Mexico, including the Cora, Tepehuán, Pima Bajo, and especially the Tarahumara, among whom he lived for more than a year.  Lumholtz was one of the first to describe artifacts from the ancient shaft tomb and the Purépecha culture.  He described archaeological sites, as well as the flora and fauna, of the northern Sierra Madre region called the gran Chichimeca. He gave a series of three lectures on "The Characteristics of Cave Dwellers of the Sierra Madre" for the Lowell Institute's 1893-94 season.

In 1905 Lumholtz was a founding member of the Explorers Club, an organization to promote exploration and scientific investigation in the field.  He went on a brief expedition to India from 1914–1915, then to Borneo from 1915 to 1917, which was his last expedition.

Borneo 

Lumholtz started an expedition in 1914 to explore the mostly unknown lands of Dutch Central Borneo,  currently part of  Indonesia. His primary focus was to interact with the indigenous peoples to learn about their culture and habits, although he also was interested in the flora and fauna of the area.

He received numerous financial grants from  geographical institutions (Norwegian Geographical Society, the Royal Geographical Society of London and the Koninklijk Nederlandsch Aardrijkskundig Genootschap), but  his journey was complicated by the outbreak of the First World War which made it difficult to acquire a military escort. He originally had planned to explore New Guinea, but this was rendered impossible by the war.

He encountered two new species of flying squirrels and one new species of colugo that were native to the area. He presented his findings in 1916 in Amsterdam in a film titled Borneo Gefilmd (translated: The filming of Borneo) which was about 40 minutes long.

In this expedition Lumholtz encountered several different tribes of indigenous people. One of them was the Dayak people, which not only are masters of woodcutting but also show tremendous fortitude when in battle with crocodiles, according to Lumholtz. They also played an important part in Lumholtz's expedition, by making camps and snares for catching wildlife, and carrying supplies for him. (Dayaks has been considered a collective term for the native people of Borneo.)

Another people Lumholtz encountered were the Punan. When Lumholtz visited the Punan, they had already discontinued the practice of head-hunting and where now a peaceful and harmless people, according to Lumholtz. He also stated that the Punan had probably copied this custom from the Dayaks.

Lumholtz wrote on his experiences in Borneo in his book, Through Central Borneo; an account of two years' travel in the land of the head-hunters between the years 1913 and 1917, published in 1920.

Later life 
In 1922 Lumholtz died of tuberculosis at Saranac Lake, New York, where he was seeking treatment at a sanatorium.  He had published six books on his discoveries, as well as the  autobiography My Life of Exploration (1921).

Legacy and honors
His greatest legacy was his books and his way of working, which strongly influenced the field of ethnography.
The Lumholtz National Park of North Queensland was named in his honor when created in 1994.  However, the name was subsequently changed to Girringun National Park in 2003 to reflect its indigenous roots.
The Mexican conifer Pinus lumholtzii, Lumholtz's pine, was named after him.
The marsupial species Lumholtz's tree-kangaroo (Dendrolagus lumholtzi) was named after him.
The snake species Calamaria lumholtzi was named after him.

Works
An incomplete list of works:
 Among Cannibals; an account of four years' travels in Australia and of camp life with the aborigines of Queensland (1889).
 Unknown Mexico; a record of five years' exploration among the tribes of the western Sierra Madre; in the tierra caliente of Tepic and Jalisco; and among the Tarascos of Michoacan (1902).
 Through Central Borneo; an account of two years' travel in the land of the head-hunters between the years 1913 and 1917 (1920).
 My life of exploration (1921).

Notes

References

External links

 
 
 
 

Norwegian anthropologists
Norwegian Mesoamericanists
Mesoamerican anthropologists
19th-century Mesoamericanists
20th-century Mesoamericanists
1851 births
1922 deaths
Norwegian ethnographers
Headhunting accounts and studies